Pratim Biswas is currently the Dean of Engineering, University of Miami, since January 2021.  He was the Lucy and Stanley Lopata Professor of Environmental Engineering Science, Asst. Vice Chancellor for International Programs, and Chair of the Department of Energy, Environmental and Chemical Engineering at Washington University in St. Louis. He is also Director of MAGEEP, the McDonnell Academy Global Energy and Environmental Partnership.  He received his doctoral degree from the California Institute of Technology, Pasadena in 1985, and his bachelor's degree in Mechanical Engineering from the Indian Institute of Technology, Bombay in 1980.  He was elected to the United States National Academy of Engineering in 2019 "for advancing the science of aerosol dynamics and particle removal technologies."

He has graduated and advised 60 PhD students, and with them published more than 450 refereed journal articles. He is one of the top aerosol research scientists in the world with one of the best and most well-equipped aerosol labs in the USA.
 
A key area of application of his work has been in the Energy and Environmental technology arena.

Career
Biswas began his academic career on the faculty of the University of Cincinnati, where he rose through the ranks to become a full professor and director of the university's Environmental Engineering Science Division and also spent a one-year sabbatical at the National Institute of Standards and Technology.  He moved to Washington University as the inaugural Stifel and Quinette Jens Professor in 2000.

At Washington University he has assembled a strong group of aerosol researchers who collectively work on a range of topics in aerosol science and engineering. These faculty work in areas of aerosol science and technology ranging from particle formation, growth, transport, measurement, control and applications. From 2006 to 2007 he was a President of the American Association for Aerosol Research.  Dr. Biswas is the current President of the International Aerosol Research Assembly.

Currently, he is the Dean, College of Engineering, University of Miami; and Professor in the Department of Chemical, Environmental and Materials Engineering and Atmospheric Sciences (Rosenstiel School of Marine and Atmospheric Sciences). He has established a bold strategic vision for Miami Engineering

Major awards
Kenneth Whitby Award from the American Association for Aerosol Research, 1991
Fellow, Academy of Sciences, St. Louis, 2003
Distinguished Alumni Award, Indian Institute of Technology, Bombay, 2011
Distinguished Faculty Award, Washington University in St. Louis, 2012
David Sinclair Award, American Association for Aerosol Research, 2013
International Aerosol Research Assembly (IARA) Fellow Award, 2014
Lawrence K. Cecil Award, AIChE, Environmental Engineering Division, 2015
White Award, International Society for Electrostatic Precipitation, 2016
Fellow, Association for Environmental Engineering Science Professors (AEESP), 2017
Fuchs Memorial Award, Outstanding contributions in Aerosol Science and Technology, 2018
Simon Freese Award, ASCE
Member, National Academy of Engineering, Elected, 2019

External links

Biswas' web page at Washington University in St. Louis
Pratim Biswas webpage at the University of Miam i

References

Living people
California Institute of Technology alumni
IIT Bombay alumni
University of Cincinnati faculty
Washington University in St. Louis faculty
Aerosol scientists
Year of birth missing (living people)
Fellows of the Association of Environmental Engineering and Science Professors